John Byrne Cooke (October 5, 1940 – September 3, 2017) was an American author, musician, and photographer. He was the son of Alistair Cooke, and the great-grandnephew of Ralph Waldo Emerson.

In the 1960s he played with the bluegrass band, the Charles River Valley Boys, and was Janis Joplin's road manager from 1967 until her death in 1970.  He wrote On the Road with Janis Joplin, detailing the period of Joplin's life from her first appearance at the Monterey Pop Festival until her death.

Cooke wrote several Western fiction novels, and book reviews for The New York Times, The Washington Post, and the Los Angeles Times. Cooke lived in Jackson Hole, Wyoming from 1982 until his death from cancer in 2017, aged 76.

References

External links
 
 1986 interview with Cooke

1940 births
2017 deaths
American bluegrass musicians
20th-century American novelists
Rock music photographers
Writers from New York City
American people of English descent
21st-century American novelists
American Western (genre) novelists
American male novelists
Deaths from cancer in Wyoming
Deaths from throat cancer
Harvard University alumni
20th-century American male writers
21st-century American male writers
Novelists from New York (state)
Country musicians from New York (state)